Brian Lawson Salmon CBE (30 June 1917 – June 2001), was a British businessman, the chairman of J. Lyons and Co. from 1972 to 1977, and the author of the Salmon Report on senior nursing staff structures and training, which has become "one of the bases of the modern profession".

Early life
Salmon was born on 30 June 1917, and educated at Malvern College. He was the second of four sons of Julius Salmon (1888–1940) and his wife Emma Gluckstein, and a grandson of one of the founders of Lyons, Barnett Salmon.

Career
Salmon was in the RAF from 1940 to 1946, rising to senior catering officer.

In the early 1960s, Salmon introduced the Wimpy hamburger to the UK, first in Lyons' cafes, then in a chain of Wimpy restaurants.

Salmon also held senior posts in the British health service, and the Salmon Report on senior nursing staff structures and training has become "one of the bases of the modern profession".

In 1972, he was appointed a CBE. On his retirement in 1977, he was succeeded as chairman by his brother Neil Salmon, who was to merge the company with Allied Breweries to become Allied Lyons.

Personal life
In 1946, Salmon married Annette Mackay, and they had two sons and a daughter. He died in June 2001, aged 83 or 84.

References

1917 births
2001 deaths
20th-century British businesspeople
British Jews
Gluckstein family
People educated at Malvern College
Brian